Arabs represent the major ethnicity in Syria, in addition to the presence of several, much smaller ethnic groups.

Ethnicity, religion and national/ideological identities
Ethnicity and religion are intertwined in Syria as in other countries in the region, but there are also nondenominational, supraethnic and suprareligious political identities, like Syrian nationalism.

Counting the ethnic or religious groups
Since the 1960 census there has been no counting of Syrians by religion, and there has never been any official counting by ethnicity or language. In the 1943 and 1953 censuses the various denominations were counted separately, e.g. for every Christian denomination. In 1960 Syrian Christians were counted as a whole but Muslims were still counted separately between Sunnis and Alawis.

Ethnoreligious groups
Most Syrians speak Arabic, most are Sunni Muslims, but there are no accurate numbers or percentages of the various "majority" and "minority" groups. Sunni Arab Syrians could be anywhere between 70% and 79% as non-Arabic-speaking groups (mostly Kurds) are usually estimated at 4%, non-Sunni Muslim groups (mostly Alawites) at less than 10% and non Arabic and Arabic-speaking Christians are 10%, but these are only indicative percentages. 
Muslim minority groups
Kurds (most Syrian Kurds are Sunni)
Arabic-speaking or Turkmen Alawis
Arabic-speaking Ismailis
Arabic-speaking (Syrian, Lebanese, Iraqi) and Iranian Twelver Shias
Sunni Muslim (and also Christian) Palestinians
Sunni and Alevi Turkmens
Sunni Circassians
Sunni Muslim Greeks
Muslim Ossetians
Black people of Yarmouk Basin
Christian minority groups
Arabic-speaking Christians (Greek-Orthodox, Greek-Catholics, Maronites and a part of the Syrian Catholics, some espouse a Syriac-Aramean identity) 
Assyrians, Aramaic speaking non-Arab people (including Chaldo-Assyrian Catholics, Assyrian Church of the East and Syriac Orthodox) and Syriacs (Orthodox)
Armenians
Other groups
 Druze
Romani people of various creeds
Jews
Yazidis are an ethno-religious group and Yezidism (Sharfadin) is one of the oldest Religion.
Mandeans
Yarsanis

See also
Demographics of Syria
Languages of Syria
Religion in Syria
Sectarianism and minorities in the Syrian Civil War
Federalization of Syria

References

External links
Sectarianism in Syria (Survey Study)